The Oswal (sometimes spelled Oshwal or Osval) are a Jain community with origins in the Marwar region of Rajasthan and Tharparkar district in Sindh. They claim to be of Rajput descent.

References

Indian castes
Social groups of Rajasthan
Social groups of Sindh
Jain communities